"Random Thoughts" is the 78th episode of the science fiction television series Voyager, the tenth episode of season four. On a spaceship making its way back to planet Earth, they stop by an alien planet. However, they become entangled in a legal proceeding due to the actions of the crew, and they must resolve it before proceeding on. This has been noted as exploration of what it means to control emotions, as often shows have the format of a morality play in the context of science fiction adventure.

This episode was written by Kenneth Biller and directed by Alexander Singer, it aired on UPN on November 19, 1997.

Plot
The Federation starship Voyager is orbiting the Mari homeworld, a race of telepaths. As the ship's crew trade for supplies, they find it difficult to haggle and bargain with mind readers. While all of this is happening, Voyagers Vulcan Security Chief, Lt. Commander Tuvok, and the city's Chief Examiner, Nimira, talk about security and maintaining order. Nimira states that her job is slowly becoming obsolete with their methods of crime prevention. There has been no violence in their society for years, and she is one of the last security officers among the Mari.  Sharing a curiosity regarding crime and punishment in their own society, Tuvok offers to transport her aboard Voyager to demonstrate their ways of security enforcement. While Captain Janeway and her half-Klingon Chief Engineer B'Elanna Torres are negotiating for a resonator coil, someone bumps into Torres, momentarily irritating her. She calms herself, shrugging it off as an accident. Moments later they run over to find the man who bumped into Torres beating another man bloody. The beaten man is severely injured as Janeway stops the aggressor. The aggressor seems surprised at himself and says he does not know why he did that.

While aboard Voyager, Nimira is puzzled about the ship's brig and the concept of incarceration as a form of punishment, only to be called back to the surface regarding the attack. After questioning the crew, Nimira determines that B'Elanna's angry thought earlier that day was transmitted telepathically to the aggressor, and thus she is the more guilty of the two. She is sentenced to undergo memory modification to remove the thought, as is the aggressor. Janeway protests, as the modification process carries the risk of neurological damage. Before Janeway can unearth enough evidence to try to get Torres out, another attack occurs with the same memory, indicating that it is still in circulation. Unfortunately this attack ends with an old woman plunging a knife into the body of an attractive young woman whom Neelix had become enamored of. Tuvok goes undercover and finds an illicit memory trade in which the salesman of the resonator coil is a key figure. He determines that B'Elanna's memory was goaded from her in order to be resold, but it was too violent for the illicit Mari tradesmen to contain, and this caused the outbursts among the Mari. Torres is released due to this new evidence, just moments before her brain was to be probed. Nimira herself is shocked to find that all thoughts of violence have not disappeared from her people.

Later at the end of the episode, Seven of Nine urges the Captain not to visit these foreign worlds to avoid such dangerous complications in the future. Janeway, however, turns down her suggestion and remarks that Voyager was built for the purpose of human exploration, and that the crew will continue to visit new worlds and take in new experiences because this was a part of the ship's mission.

Notes
Nimira's actress, Gwynyth Walsh, was also attracted to the thought-provoking nature of the episode. Shortly after working on the installment, she related, "From my perspective, the episode certainly seemed to be dealing with the censorship issue, which is especially prevalent in the United States right now. The American Far Right [lobby] has a lot of control over what is on television these days, and I think the script attempts to explore the potential negatives of that kind of censorship.

When Tuvok and Guill conduct a mind-meld to exchange violent thoughts, the dream sequence shows images from other episodes and Paramount Pictures productions at the time: for a short moment a scene from the film Event Horizon is visible.

Reception 
In 2017, an article on Medium suggested that this was a worthwhile episode of the series for kids to watch, because it shows the importance of a person controlling their emotions.

In 2020, Tor.com rated this 9 out 10, remarking "..this is a strong, powerful Trek episode that beautifully does what Trek does best." and praised the script, characters, and acting.

Releases 
In 2017, the complete Star Trek: Voyager television series was released in a DVD box set with special features.

References

External links

 

Star Trek: Voyager (season 4) episodes
1997 American television episodes